White Fawn's Devotion: A Play Acted by a Tribe of Red Indians in America is a 1910 American short dramatic silent film. Although a few writers believe the film features Young Deer's wife, Lillian St. Cyr, otherwise known as Princess Red Wing as "White Fawn", the lead woman does not fit St. Cyr's description. IMDb now identifies the lead actress as Lucille Young. The movie was shot in New Jersey at 24fps.

White Fawn's Devotion is the earliest surviving film directed by a Native American.  It was one of the earlier films shot in America by the French company Pathé. A reviewer in the New York Dramatic Mirror wrote that the film "proves to be interesting if we can forget the New Jersey scenery" and noted that "it is not quite clear where the devotion comes in, nor of what it consists."

In 2008, the movie was added to the United States National Film Registry as being deemed "culturally, historically, or aesthetically significant".

Plot
A white settler named Combs, his Indian wife, White Fawn, and their daughter live in a Dakota log cabin. When Combs gets word that he is to inherit a large fortune, his Native American wife is upset. Believing that she will lose her husband if he returns East, she stabs herself with a knife. Her husband finds her and removes the knife, but their daughter sees him with the knife in his hand and her apparently dead mother. The girl, believing her father committed the murder, alerts the nearby Indian village. Several Indians then engage the settler in a long chase. When the settler is captured, the Indians intend to put him to death until White Fawn miraculously revives and informs the Indians of the truth. This ending, in which an interracial couple ends up together, is a rare occurrence for this period of film production. The surviving print, preserved by the Library of Congress, is missing a few feet at its end. This print was digitized for the Treasures from American Film Archives DVD set, therefore subsequent digital releases are also missing the ending. Contemporary publicity from Pathé fills in the resolution: "the Combs take their departure and return to their home, for he feels he will be happier with his family on the plains than if he goes east and claims his legacy."

Production
James Young Deer (also known as J. Younger Johnston or James Young Johnson), the uncredited director and writer of White Fawn's Devotion, was believed to be the first Native American film director. His ancestors were members of the Nanticoke people of Delaware.  Young Deer was hired by Pathé Frères as a director and scenario writer and frequently worked in collaboration with his actress wife Lillian St. Cyr, also known by her stage name Princess Red Wing. Out of the more than 100 short and a few feature films he made, White Fawn's Devotion is one of fewer than 10 films of Young Deer's to have survived.

References

External links
 Article on James Young Deer by Angela Aleiss at Bright Lights Film Journal
  The film White Fawn's Devotion at Wikisource
 White Fawn’s Devotion essay by Scott Simmon at National Film Registry
 White Fawn’s Devotion essay by Daniel Eagan in America's Film Legacy: The Authoritative Guide to the Landmark Movies in the National Film Registry, A&C Black, 2010 , pages 20–22
 
 
 
 
 

1910 drama films
1910 films
American silent short films
American black-and-white films
Films shot in New Jersey
Films about Native Americans
United States National Film Registry films
1910 short films
Silent American drama films
Articles containing video clips
1910s English-language films
1910s American films
American drama short films